The briazkaltsia is a Ukrainian folk instrument consisting of copper or brass plates strung from a wire. In the past it was made of silver. When the instrument was shaken, it produced a jingling sound reminiscent of small bells. The instrument is now no longer used.

Hornbostel-Sachs classification number 112.11

See also
Ukrainian folk music

Sources
Humeniuk, A. - Ukrainski narodni muzychni instrumenty - Kyiv: Naukova dumka, 1967
Mizynec, V. - Ukrainian Folk Instruments - Melbourne: Bayda books, 1984
Cherkaskyi, L. - Ukrainski narodni muzychni instrumenty // Tekhnika, Kyiv, Ukraine, 2003 - 262 pages. 

Ukrainian musical instruments
Idiophones